The Magic of Disney Animation was a show and tour at Disney's Hollywood Studios, Florida. A Disney animator would show guests how the characters in Disney animated films were chosen and designed. The attraction closed permanently on July 12, 2015. In December 2015, the building began to be used to house the Star Wars Launch Bay.

Summary
Originally, when the park first opened in 1989, the Feature Animation pavilion of "The Magic of Disney Animation," designed originally by award-winning experience designer Bob Rogers and the design team BRC Imagination Arts, included four connected experiences which explored the legacy of Disney animation.  The tour commenced with the live action/animated short film entitled "Back to Neverland,"  in which veteran newscaster, Walter Cronkite and comedian Robin Williams guided guests through the different stages in animating a feature-length film by turning Williams into an animated character in the form of one of the Lost Boys of Peter Pan.  Following that introductory film, guest would witness the process of animation, first-hand, from elevated, glass-enclosed walkways within Disney's actual animation studio.  The third segment of the animation tour was a short film in which Disney Animators described the joy of the art of animation.  A finale film, entitled "Classic Disney" presented a montage of key moments from classic animated Disney films and shorts.

The Magic of Disney Animation had one main showroom, where a Disney animator showed guests how the characters in Disney animated films were chosen and designed, with the help of Mushu, the dragon from Disney's Mulan, (voiced in the show by Eddie Murphy's sound double, Mark Moseley.) Mulan was the first of three films produced by the former Orlando, Florida division of Walt Disney Feature Animation, which was headquartered in the building before being closed in 2004. After guests left the showroom they were led to an area with interactive games and a chance to meet characters from the latest Disney animated pictures. There was also a section called The Animation Academy, where guests could draw their favorite Disney characters, under the guidance of a Disney Animator. Several original cels from classic Disney films as well as several of the Academy Awards won by Disney films were on display at the attraction.

Inside the building which housed The Magic of Disney Animation, were the former production facilities of Walt Disney Animation Orlando. Some of its productions included:

 Ink and paint for The Little Mermaid (1989)
 Two of the three Who Framed Roger Rabbit spinoff cartoons; Roller Coaster Rabbit (1990) and Trail Mix-Up (1993)
 The "Be Our Guest" sequence from Beauty and the Beast (1991)
 Off His Rockers short (1992)
 The concept design and animation of Princess Jasmine from Aladdin (1992)
 The "I Just Can't Wait to Be King" sequence from The Lion King (1994)
 Mulan (1998)
 John Henry short (2000)
 Lilo & Stitch (2002)
 Brother Bear (2003)

An expanded production area was dedicated and opened on April 22, 1998, the same day Disney's Animal Kingdom opened. Roy E. Disney noted it in his dedication speech.

Films shown during the attraction
 Flowers and Trees
 Snow White and the Seven Dwarfs
 Brave Little Tailor
 The Ugly Duckling
 Pinocchio
 Fantasia
 Dumbo
 Bambi
 Make Mine Music
 Song of the South
 Melody Time
 The Adventures of Ichabod and Mr. Toad
 Cinderella
 Alice in Wonderland
 Peter Pan
 Lady and the Tramp
 Sleeping Beauty
 One Hundred and One Dalmatians
 The Sword in the Stone
 Mary Poppins
 Winnie the Pooh and the Honey Tree
 The Jungle Book
 The Rescuers
 The Fox and the Hound
 The Black Cauldron
 The Great Mouse Detective

List of Handprints in forecourt
 Marc Davis (May 1, 1989)
 Ken Anderson (May 1, 1989)
 K. O'Connor (May 1, 1989)
 Ollie Johnston (May 1, 1989)
 Frank Thomas (May 1, 1989)
 Ward Kimball (May 1, 1989)

References

External links 
 Walt Disney World Resort - The Magic of Disney Animation Retrieved May 2012
Stories from Walt Disney Animation Orlando Retrieved May 2012

Disney's Hollywood Studios
Former Walt Disney Parks and Resorts attractions
Disney production studios
Animation Courtyard
Amusement rides introduced in 1989
Amusement rides that closed in 2015
1989 establishments in Florida
2015 disestablishments in Florida